Dr. Kent L. Thornburg, Ph.D. (born July 11, 1945) is an American scientist, researcher and professor. He lives in Portland, Oregon and works at Oregon Health & Science University (OHSU), in the School of Medicine. He is the director for both the OHSU Center for Developmental Health and the Moore Institute for Nutrition & Wellness

Developmental Origins of Health and Disease

Thornburg uses a broad range of scientific disciplines to investigate how maternal stressors before, during and after pregnancy affect the risk for the offspring acquiring chronic diseases later in life. This field of research is known as the Developmental Origins of Health and Disease (DOHaD). He was a friend and collaborator of Professor David Barker, FRS, the English physician and epidemiologist who originated the Barker Hypothesis, which proposed that the environmental, social, and nutritional conditions that an embryo, fetus and early infant is exposed to, determine their risk for acquiring chronic diseases like heart disease, diabetes, obesity and osteoporosis later in life.

Current research (2020)
Thornburg's research includes cardiac and pulmonary (lung) physiology, placentology, and developmental programming - as well as epigenetics and epidemiology. He studies the ways in which the fetus adapts to a variety of stressors during pregnancy, including psychosocial and nutritional stress. He also studies the roles that maternal obesity, preeclampsia and gestational diabetes play in placental and fetal growth. He collaborates with scientists in several countries, in rural Oregon and in Alaska.

Education

1967: Bachelor of Arts in Biology (George Fox University)

1970 and 1972: Master of Science in Zoology and Doctorate of Philosophy in Developmental Physiology and Embryology, (Oregon State University)

1971-1973: NIH Post-doctoral fellow, Cardiovascular Sciences, Department of Physiology (now Department of Chemical Physiology and Biochemistry, (Oregon Health and Science University)

1974: Postdoctoral Studies: Electron Microscopy and Physics, (Washington University School of Medicine, St. Louis)

1989-1990: Sabbatical, Molecular Embryology (University of Manchester, UK)

Academic positions

Thornburg is the M. Lowell Edwards Endowed Chair for Cardiovascular Research and Professor of Medicine in the Knight Cardiovascular Institute at OHSU. He holds joint professorships in the Departments of Chemical Physiology and Biochemistry, Biomedical Engineering, Anesthesiology & Perioperative Medicine and Obstetrics, and Gynecology.

References

External links
Kent L. Thornburg at Google Scholar

American medical academics
Oregon Health & Science University faculty
1945 births
Living people
George Fox University alumni
Oregon State University alumni